Desfesoterodine (INN, also called 5-hydroxymethyltolterodine) is an antimuscarinic drug. It is the active metabolite of fesoterodine, its isobutyrate ester.

References

Muscarinic antagonists
Primary alcohols
Phenols
Diisopropylamino compounds